German submarine U-246 was a Type VIIC U-boat of Nazi Germany's Kriegsmarine during World War II. The submarine was laid down on 30 November 1942 at the Friedrich Krupp Germaniawerft yard at Kiel, launched on 7 December 1943 and commissioned on 11 January 1944 under the command of Kapitänleutnant Ernst Raabe.

After training with the 5th U-boat Flotilla at Kiel, U-246 was transferred to the 3rd U-boat Flotilla for front-line service on 1 August 1944. However, before the U-boat had sailed on her first combat patrol the flotilla was disbanded, and the U-boat was transferred to the 11th flotilla based at Bergen in Norway, on 1 October 1944. She was sunk on 17 March 1945.

Design
German Type VIIC submarines were preceded by the shorter Type VIIB submarines. U-246 had a displacement of  when at the surface and  while submerged. She had two shafts and two  propellers.

U-246 was fitted with five  torpedo tubes (four fitted at the bow and one at the stern), fourteen torpedoes, one  SK C/35 naval gun, (220 rounds), one  Flak M42 and two twin  C/30 anti-aircraft guns. The boat had a complement of between forty-four and sixty.

Service history
U-246 had a very short career. She only participated in two war patrols and did not sink any enemy vessels. Her last report was made on 7 March 1945, while in the middle of her second patrol. Shortly afterwards, she sank due to depth charges from British ASW trawler HMS Lady Madeleine in the Irish Sea with the loss of her entire crew of 48 men.

First patrol
U-246 sailed from Kiel to Horten Naval Base in Norway, from 28 to 30 September 1944, continuing on to Kristiansand on 4 and 5 October. From there she sailed on her first patrol on 7 October, around the British Isles to the waters south-west of Ireland. On 26 October she was attacked by an unknown Allied aircraft with depth charges, causing severe damage and forcing the U-boat to return to base at Stavanger on 11 November. The next day U-246 sailed from Stavanger to Bergen for repairs.

Second patrol
The U-boat sailed from Bergen on 21 February 1945. On 7 March she reported for the last time while en route for her operational area in the Irish Sea. No further reports were received, she was sunk on 17 March 1945.

See also
 German U-boat bases in occupied Norway

References

Bibliography

External links

World War II submarines of Germany
German Type VIIC submarines
U-boats commissioned in 1944
U-boats sunk in 1945
Ships built in Kiel
Ships lost with all hands
Maritime incidents in April 1945